Greg Sands is the current head coach of the Texas Tech Red Raiders men's golf team.

External links
Profile at Texas Tech Athletics
Texas Tech Golf

Texas Tech Red Raiders men's golf coaches
Year of birth missing (living people)
Living people